Ealand is a small village in the civil parish of Crowle and Ealand, in the North Lincolnshire district, in the county of Lincolnshire, England.

The Stainforth and Keadby Canal and Crowle railway station are at the southern edge of Ealand. The A161, which previously ran through the village, has been diverted, and uses a new bridge over the parallel railway line and canal.

Ealand has a Primitive Methodist chapel, a war memorial, and the disused building of the previous New Trent Inn. It has two Grade II listed buildings, an early to mid-18th-century house on Ealand Outgate and early 19th-century Curlews farmhouse on the A161.

Immediately to the west of the A161 is Seven Lakes Leisure Park, sited on clay pits of the former Crowle Brickworks.

References

External links

Crowle Community Forum
Isle of Axholme website
"Crowle", Genuki.org.uk. Retrieved 23 July 2011

Villages in the Borough of North Lincolnshire